Dame Anne Margaret Bryans  (29 October 1909 – 21 April 2004) was a British humanitarian and healthcare administrator, remembered as an "indomitable doyenne of the caring profession." She spent much of her life in the service of the British Red Cross Society and the Order of St John of Jerusalem in England, serving with distinction with the Voluntary Aid Detachment (VAD) and Joint War Organisation during World War II. She was Chairman of the Joint Service Hospitals Welfare and VAD Committee from 1960 to 1989.

Early years
Anne Margaret Gilmour was born at 9 Atholl Crescent in Edinburgh, Scotland on 29 October 1909, the eldest child of the Rt Hon. Sir John Gilmour of Lundin and Montrave, 2nd Baronet, and Mary Louise. She was privately educated at Montrave, the Gilmour family estate near Leven, Fife, by a Belgian governess and later studied at the Sorbonne.

Career
She joined the British Red Cross Society in the late 1920 and became a member of staff in 1938. She became the Deputy Commissioner of the British Red Cross and St John War Organisation, Middle East Commission, in 1943 and was Commissioner from January 1945 to June 1945. She was the only woman to be appointed a Commissioner during the Second World War. She was Deputy Chairman of the BRCS Executive Committee from 1953 to 1964, and Vice-Chairman from 1964 to 1976.

Dame Anne Bryans died at Lundin Links in Fife, Scotland, on 21 April 2004, aged 94.

Personal life 
In 1932, she married Lieutenant Commander John Reginald "Jack" Bryans , son of clergyman Reginald du Faure Bryans. The couple had one child, Lieutenant Commander John Patrick Gilmour Bryans , born in 1933.

Other appointments
 Lay Member of the Council for Professions Supplementary to Medicine (a predecessor of the Health and Care Professions Council), 1973–79
 Member of the Board of Governors, the Eastman Dental Hospital, 1973–79
 Member, Camden and Islington Area Health Authority, 1974–79
 Vice-President, Open Section, Royal Society of Medicine, 1975, President 1980–82; 
 Member of the Independent Television Authority, later Independent Broadcasting Authority
 Member of the Government Anglo-Egyptian Resettlement Board; Member of the BBC/ITA Appeals Committee
 Special Trustee and Chairman of the Royal Free Hospital and the Friends of the Royal Free Hospital
 Vice-President of the Royal College of Nursing
 Governor of Westminster Hospital
Source:

References

External links
 Photographs of Dame Anne Bryans at the British Red Cross Museum & Archives

1909 births
2004 deaths
British humanitarians
Dames Commander of the Order of the British Empire
Dames of Grace of the Order of St John
Daughters of baronets
People in health professions from Edinburgh
Fellows of the Royal Society of Medicine